Franz Hasil (born 28 July 1944 in Vienna) is a former Austrian footballer.

Club career
Born in Vienna, Hasil started his career at local giants Rapid Wien before moving abroad to play for Schalke 04. After one season in Germany, he moved to Feyenoord and was part of their European Cup victory in 1970. He was sold to Austria Klagenfurt in for €23,000.

International career
He earned 21 caps for the Austria national football team, scoring two goals.

Honours
Rapid Wien
Austrian Football Bundesliga: 1963–64, 1966–67, 1967–68
 Austrian Cup: 1967–68

Feyenoord Rotterdam
 European Cup: 1969–70
 Intercontinental Cup: 1970
 Eredivisie: 1970–71

References

External links
 Franz Hasil at Rapid archive
 

1944 births
Living people
Austrian footballers
SK Rapid Wien players
FC Schalke 04 players
Feyenoord players
FC Kärnten players
First Vienna FC players
Bundesliga players
Eredivisie players
Austria international footballers
Austrian expatriate footballers
Expatriate footballers in the Netherlands
Austrian expatriate sportspeople in the Netherlands
Expatriate footballers in Germany
Austrian expatriate sportspeople in Germany
Footballers from Vienna
Austrian football managers
First Vienna FC managers
Association football midfielders
UEFA Champions League winning players